Sewer commonly refers to a part of sewerage, the infrastructure that conveys sewage.

Types of sewers include:

 Combined sewer
Effluent sewer
Gravity sewer
Sanitary sewer
Storm sewer
Vacuum sewer
Other uses:
Sewer, one who does sewing

See also
 Sewage, wastewater produced by a community of people
 Sewer overflow (disambiguation)